The 1st Uruguayan Film Critics Association Awards were held in 2001.

Winners
Best Film: Fa yeung nin wa (a.k.a. In the Mood for Love, Hong Kong/France/Thailand)
Best Latin American Film: La Ciénaga (a.k.a. The Swamp, Argentina/France/Spain)
Best Uruguayan Film: 25 Watts

References
IMDb - Uruguayan Film Critics Association 2001

 

Uruguayan Film Critics Association Awards
2001 film awards